During the 1994–95 English football season, Everton F.C. competed in the FA Premier League.

Season summary
After the previous season's "houdini" escape act which preserved Everton's top flight status, manager Mike Walker was expected to take the club forward and challenge for honours. But a failure to win any of their first twelve Premier League games saw the board run out of patience with Walker and terminated his contract after less than a year at the helm. Former player Joe Royle was named as Walker's successor, and quickly set about reshaping a squad of broken men.

Royle's impact was instantaneous, taking nine points from his first three games, with the standout result being a 2–0 win over rivals Liverpool in the Merseyside derby in his first match as manager. From Royle's appointment to the close of the season the club were firmly in the top six of the form guide, beating champions Manchester United at home and winning away at Chelsea amongst other highlights, leading to Shoot! magazine to dub the transformation 'The Royle Revolution'. League survival was not guaranteed until May however due to the club's poor start, and was secured following a 1–0 win away at already relegated Ipswich Town in the penultimate game of the season. Royle began a sequence when Everton went four-and-a-half calendar years unbeaten in Merseyside derbies, and masterminded a memorable 4–1 demolition of Tottenham Hotspur in the 1995 FA Cup Semi-Final. 

Everton finished 15th, but the biggest news of May was victory in the FA Cup Final. The opposition were Premier League runners-up Manchester United, who were most pundits' favourites to win, despite the fact that Everton had previously beaten United in the league that season. A goal from Everton's Paul Rideout, and a succession of thrilling saves by goalkeeper Neville Southall, gave Everton their first major trophy for eight years and their first European campaign of the post-Heysel era.

Royle's arrival at Everton also saw the permanent signature of powerful Scottish striker Duncan Ferguson, and Earl Barrett soon following. Leaving the club were a number of Mike Walker signings including: flop striker Brett Angell, reserve defender Gary Rowett and left-back David Burrows who had only arrived at the club earlier in the season. Long-serving defender/midfielder Ian Snodin who was part of the 1986–87 title-winning side also left the club. Neville Southall and Dave Watson still remained from that side.

Everton fans were given more hope of sustained success after the season was over, when it was announced that the club had agreed to sign Russian winger Andrei Kanchelskis from Manchester United for a then-club record fee of £5 million.

Kit
Everton's kit was manufactured by Umbro and sponsored by NEC.

Final league table

Results summary

Results by round

Results
Everton's score comes first

Legend

FA Premier League

FA Cup

League Cup

Squad

Left club during season

Reserve squad

Transfers

In

Out

Transfers in:  £10,900,000
Transfers out:  £1,700,000
Total spending:  £9,200,000

References

Everton
Everton F.C. season
Everton F.C. seasons